Burin may refer to:

Tools
 Burin (engraving), a tool with a narrow sharp face at the tip used for engraving and other purposes
 Burin (lithic flake), a type of Stone Age tool with a chisel-like edge

Places
 Burin, Nablus, a village on the West Bank, Palestine
 Burin, Newfoundland and Labrador, a town in Canada
 Burin Peninsula, a Canadian peninsula

See also 
 Tonde Burin, a 1994-1995 manga and anime series
 Felipe Burin (born 1992), Brazilian footballer
 Buren (disambiguation)